Slovenia competed at the 2004 Summer Paralympics in Athens, Greece. The team included 28 athletes, 14 men and 14 women. Competitors from Slovenia won 4 medals, including 1 gold, 2 silver and 1 bronze to finish 49th in the medal table.

Medallists

Sports

Athletics

Men's track

Men's field

Women's field

Goalball
The men's goalball team didn't win any medals; they were 11th out of 12 teams.

Players
Gorazd Dolanc
Matej Ledinek
Zlatko Mihajlovič
Dejan Pirc
Ivan Vinkler
Boštjan Vogrinčič

Tournament

Shooting

Men

Swimming

Men

Table tennis

Volleyball
The women's volleyball team didn't win any medals; they were defeated by the United States in the bronze medal match.

Players
Marinka Cencelj
Anita Goltnik Urnaut
Danica Gošnak
Emilie Gradišek
Bogomira Jakin
Saša Kotnik
Boža Kovačič
Nadja Ovčjak
Alenka Šart
Tanja Simonič
Štefka Tomič

Tournament

See also
Slovenia at the Paralympics
Slovenia at the 2004 Summer Olympics

References 

Nations at the 2004 Summer Paralympics
2004
Summer Paralympics